Erich Masurat (11 August 1927 – 25 October 2012) was a German sports shooter. He competed in the 25 metre pistol event at the 1968 Summer Olympics for West Germany.

References

1927 births
2012 deaths
German male sport shooters
Olympic shooters of West Germany
Shooters at the 1968 Summer Olympics
Sportspeople from Königsberg